28 Corps, 28th Corps, Twenty Eighth Corps, or XXVIII Corps may refer to:

 XXVIII Army Corps (Wehrmacht), a German unit during World War II
 XXVIII Army Corps (Italy), an Italian unit during World War I
 28th Army Corps (Russian Empire), a Russian unit during World War I